Muthumudalige Pushpakumara (born 26 September 1981) is a Sri Lankan cricket coach and former international player. A left-handed batsman and right-arm off break bowler, he played three One Day International (ODI) and one Twenty20 International (T20I) matches for the Sri Lanka national cricket team between 2009 and 2010.

Early life
Pushpakumara studied at Ananda College, Colombo.

International career
He made his One Day International (ODI) debut in late 2009 against India, which was abandoned because of dangerous pitch. Pushpakumara made his only T20I appearance in the same tour in India, where Sri Lanka won the match by 29 runs.

Coaching career
Pushpakumara was appointed head coach of the Kuwait national cricket team in 2019. He was additionally appointed spin bowling coach of the Jaffna Kings for the 2021 Lanka Premier League.

Notes

External links
 

1981 births
Cricketers from Colombo
Basnahira North cricketers
Colts Cricket Club cricketers
Tamil Union Cricket and Athletic Club cricketers
Sri Lankan cricketers
Sri Lanka One Day International cricketers
Sri Lanka Twenty20 International cricketers
Living people
Uva cricketers
Sri Lankan cricket coaches
Sri Lankan expatriates in Kuwait